Börje Hedblom (13 March 1940 – 28 December 1976) was a Swedish bobsledder. He competed in the two-man and the four-man events at the 1968 Winter Olympics.

References

1940 births
1976 deaths
Swedish male bobsledders
Olympic bobsledders of Sweden
Bobsledders at the 1968 Winter Olympics
Sportspeople from Stockholm
20th-century Swedish people